Hong Jong-hyun (born February 2, 1990) is a South Korean actor and model.

Career
Hong began his entertainment career in 2007 as a professional model. He made his acting debut in 2008,  and has appeared in the romantic comedy Oh! My Lady (2010), sitcom Vampire Idol (2011), followed by supporting roles in Jeon Woo-chi (2012) and Dating Agency: Cyrano (2013).
In 2014, Hong was cast in his first leading role in the cable series Her Lovely Heels, followed by the melodrama Mama. He also joined the fourth season of reality show We Got Married, pairing up with Girl's Day member Yura.

Hong next starred in the romantic comedy film Enemies In-Law and horror film Alice: Boy from Wonderland in 2015, followed by historical drama Moon Lovers: Scarlet Heart Ryeo in 2016.

In 2017, he co-starred in historical melo-romance drama The King in Love.
In 2018, he was cast in the romantic comedy drama My Absolute Boyfriend, based on the Japanese manga series of the same name. He is also set to star in the time-loop drama film Spring, Again.

In March 2019, Hong is confirmed to star in the weekend drama Mother of Mine.

Hong enlisted for his mandatory service on December 2, 2019.

After discharge from military service In October 2021, Hong attended the What We Lost Vol.2 photo exhibition as a photographer.

In 2022, Hong returns to the original  TVING drama Stock Struck, after his discharge from the military.

Filmography

Film

Television series

Web series

Television shows

Music video appearances

Awards and nominations

Notes

References

External links
 
 
 

South Korean male television actors
South Korean male film actors
South Korean male models
People from Seoul
Living people
1990 births
Konkuk University alumni